Cape Constantine is a cape in the U.S. state of Alaska. It is the most southerly point on the Nushagak Peninsula, and defines the southern side of Kulukak Bay and the eastern point of Nushagak Bay.

Landforms of Dillingham Census Area, Alaska
Constantine, Cape